James Ellington (born 6 September 1985) is a British sprinter, who races in the 100 metres and 200 metres. He has represented his country twice at the Olympic Games (2012, 2016), is a two-time relay gold medallist with Great Britain at the European Athletics Championships (2014, 2016), a silver medallist at the 2014 Commonwealth Games with the England relay team, and is a three-time participant at the World Athletics Championships.

At national level, he won back-to-back titles in the 200 m at the British Athletics Championships from 2012 to 2013.

Career
He made his world senior championship debut at the 2011 World Championships in Athletics in Daegu, running 20.82 in the 200 m and finishing 5th in his heat. James was in the Great Britain Olympic team for the 2012 Summer Olympics, running in the 200 metres. He finished fifth in his heat of the 200 metres and failed to progress.  At the 2014 Commonwealth Games, he failed to reach the 200 m final, but was part of the England team that won the silver medal in men's 4 × 100 m, running in the heats.  At the 2014 European Championships, he reached the semifinal in the men's 200 m, and was part of the Great Britain team that won the gold medal, running in the heat and final.

In November 2011 Ellington attracted widespread press coverage by selling his sponsorship rights on eBay in the run up to London 2012. The winning bid was £32,550, but the winning bidder was not genuine. Ellington eventually attracted sponsorship from skincare company King of Shaves, who offered to sponsor him if the eBay deal fell through.

Accident
On 17 January 2017, Ellington was injured in a road accident alongside fellow sprinter Nigel Levine; the pair "were riding a motorbike when they were struck head on by a car travelling on the wrong side of the road". They were in Tenerife, Spain, undertaking warm-weather training with a group of British sprinters. Both athletes were admitted to hospital and were described on 18 January as "conscious and stable". The Guardian suggested that Ellington's injuries were "career ending" and stated that they consisted of "broken bones in his tibia and fibula and [he] is also believed to have fractured his pelvis".

References

External links

1985 births
Living people
English male sprinters
British male sprinters
Olympic male sprinters
Olympic athletes of Great Britain
Athletes (track and field) at the 2012 Summer Olympics
Athletes (track and field) at the 2016 Summer Olympics
Commonwealth Games silver medallists for England
Commonwealth Games medallists in athletics
Athletes (track and field) at the 2014 Commonwealth Games
World Athletics Championships athletes for Great Britain
European Athletics Championships winners
European Athletics Championships medalists
British Athletics Championships winners
Black British sportsmen
Medallists at the 2014 Commonwealth Games